Ganesh Ghimiray is a Bhutanese politician who has been a member of the National Assembly of Bhutan, since October 2018.

Education 
He holds a master's degree in International Hotel and Tourism Management.

Political career 
Before joining politics, Gimiray was an  Entrepreneur.

He ran for the seat of the National Council of Bhutan from Samtse Dzongkhag in the 2013 Bhutanese National Council election, but was unsuccessful.

He was elected to the National Assembly of Bhutan as a candidate of DNT from Phuentshogpelri-Samtse constituency in 2018 Bhutanese National Assembly election. He received 5,332  votes and defeated Kamal Dhan Chamling, a candidate of DPT.

References 

1970 births
Living people
Bhutanese people of Nepalese descent
Bhutanese MNAs 2018–2023
Druk Nyamrup Tshogpa politicians
Druk Nyamrup Tshogpa MNAs